Klaus Junge (1 January 1924 – 17 April 1945) was one of the youngest Chilean-German chess masters. In several tournaments during the 1940s he held his own among the world's leading players. An officer in the Wehrmacht, he died during the Battle of Welle shortly before the end of World War II.

Biography 
Junge was born into a German Chilean family. His father Otto was a strong chess player who won the Chilean Chess Championship in 1922. In 1928 his parents and their five sons returned to Germany.

On 11–20 August 1939, he, along with Wolfgang Unzicker (14 years old), Edith Keller (17), Rudolf Kunath (15) and Karl Krbavic (17), played in Fürstenwalde (Jugendschachwoche) near Berlin.
In 1941, at the age of 17, Klaus Junge was considered one of the strongest players in Germany. In 1941, he won the championship of Hamburg. In May 1941, he won at Bad Elster (qualifying German championship). In August 1941, he tied for first with Paul Felix Schmidt at Bad Oeynhausen (the eighth German Championship), although he lost a playoff match against Schmidt for the title at Bromberg (+0 –3 =1). In October 1941, he took fourth place, behind Alexander Alekhine, Schmidt, and Efim Bogoljubow, at Kraków/Warsaw (the second General Government chess tournament championship).

In January 1942, Junge won the Dresden tournament. In 1942, he took second place, behind Walter Niephaus, at Leipzig. In April 1942, he was second, behind Carl Carls, at Rostock. In June 1942, he tied for third–fourth with Schmidt, behind Alekhine and Paul Keres, at the Salzburg 1942 chess tournament. In September, he took seventh place at the Munich (the first European Championship), won by Alekhine. In October 1942, he took second place, behind Alekhine, at Warsaw/Lublin/Kraków (the third General Government championship). In December 1942, he tied for first with Alekhine at Prague (Duras Jubileé, 60-jährigen Jubiläum). In 1942–43, he played in three correspondence tournaments, beating among others Rudolf Teschner and Emil Joseph Diemer.

Klaus Junge, whose father had been a member of the Nazi Party since 1932, was an adherent of the National Socialist ideology. As a lieutenant of the Wehrmacht he died in combat against Allied troops on 17 April 1945 in the Battle of Welle on the Lüneburg Heath, close to Hamburg, three weeks before World War II ended.

In 1946, Regensburg hosted the first Klaus Junge Memorial. The event was won by Fedor Bohatirchuk, ahead of Elmārs Zemgalis, Wolfgang Unzicker, etc.

Notable games 

Kurt Richter vs Klaus Junge, Bad Oeynhausen 1941, GER-ch, Trompowsky Attack, A45, 0–1
Klaus Junge vs Paul Mross, Krakow 1941, Nimzo-Indian, Rubinstein Variation, E47, 1–0
Alexander Alekhine vs Klaus Junge, Salzburg 1942, Semi-Slav Defense, Marshall Gambit, D31, 0–1
Klaus Junge vs Čeněk Kottnauer, Prague 1942, Queen's Gambit Declined Semi-Slav, D46, 1–0
Klaus Junge vs Emil Josef Diemer, XVII.corr. tournament 1942–43, King's Gambit Accepted, C34, 1–0
Klaus Junge vs Walter Sahlmann, Hamburg 1944, Sicilian, Scheveningen Variation, B84, 1–0

Further reading
 Helmut Riedl: Das Leben und Schaffen von Klaus Junge. Unterhaching 1995.

References 
Notes

External links 

Photographs of Klaus Junge

1924 births
1945 deaths
German chess players
People from Concepción, Chile
Chilean emigrants to Germany
Chilean people of German descent
German Army officers of World War II
German Army personnel killed in World War II
20th-century chess players
Reich Labour Service members